The 2022 Meath Intermediate Football Championship was the 96th edition of the Meath GAA's premier club Gaelic football tournament for Intermediate graded teams in County Meath, Ireland. The tournament consisted of 18 teams and started with a group stage before progressing to a knock out stage. The winner will represent Meath in the Leinster Intermediate Club Football Championship.

Trim were the 2021 Meath Intermediate Football Champions after they defeated Oldcastle in the final. As a result, after competing at Intermediate level since 2012, they will compete in the 2022 Meath Senior Football Championship.

Dunshaughlin were relegated from the Senior Football Championship in 2021 after competing in the Senior Football Championship since 1998 and winning three Meath Senior Football Championships and one Leinster Senior Club Football Championship in that time.
St. Vincent's were promoted to the I.F.C. after beating Dunsany in the 2021 Meath Junior Football Championship final.
Syddan, Ballinlough and Moylagh were relegated to the 2022 Meath Junior Football Championship.

The draw for the group stages of the championship took place on 9 May 2022 with the games commencing on 7 July 2022.

On 15 October 2022, Dunshaughlin beat Duleek/Bellewstown by 0-17 to 0-7 to win the Mattie McDonnell Cup for the third time in their history and return to the senior ranks having only been relegated the previous season.

Championship Structure
The championship consisted of four groups, two containing four teams and two containing five teams. The top two teams in each group progressed to the knockout stages while the bottom team in each group contested the relegation playoffs.

Team changes
The following teams have changed division since the 2021 championship season.

From I.F.C.
Promoted to 2022 S.F.C.
 Trim - (Intermediate Champions)

Relegated to 2022 Meath Junior Football Championship
 Syddan
 Ballinlough
 Moylagh

To I.F.C.
Relegated from 2021 S.F.C.
 DunshaughlinPromoted from 2021 J.F.C. St. Vincent's - (Junior 'A' Champions)

Participating teams
The teams taking part in the 2022 Meath Intermediate Football Championship are:

Group stage 

There are four groups, with Groups A & B containing 4 teams each and Groups C & D containing 5 teams each. The top two teams in each group automatically qualify for the quarter finals.

As in 2021, three teams will be relegated from IFC to JFC in 2022 in order to bring the IFC from 20 teams to 16 teams in 2023. In 2022, the last placed teams in each group (four teams in total) will be randomly drawn into the relegation semi-finals. The relegation final winner stays in IFC - and the other 3 teams are relegated to the JFC.Tiebreakers:If two or more teams were equal on points on completion of the group matches, the following tie-breaking criteria would be applied:

All Football Championships and Leagues shall be run on a combination of a league and knockout basis under Rule 6.21 T.O. Where teams finish equal with points for qualification or relegation process for concluding stages, the positioning shall be decided as follows;

 (i) Where three teams are involved - the outcome of the meetings of the three teams in their previous games in the competition. If three teams finish level on points for three places and one team has beaten the other two teams that team qualifies in first place and other places are determined by the specified order. If there are two positions and one team has beaten the other two teams that team qualifies and the second place is determined by the specified order. If there is one position and one team has beaten the other two team that team qualifies;
 (ii) Where two teams are involved - the outcome of the meeting of the two teams in the previous game in the competition;
 (iii) Scoring Difference;
 (iv) Highest total scores for;
 (v) A play-off.

Group ARound 1 Oldcastle 3-6, 0-17 Walterstown, Kells, 6/8/2022
 St. Michael's 1-10, 0-9 St. Vincent's, Seneschalstown, 7/8/2022Round 2 St. Vincent's 1-5, 3-15 Oldcastle, Trim, 21/8/2022
 Walterstown 0-12, 2-12 St. Michael's, Kells, 21/8/2022Round 3 Walterstown 4-12, 0-7 St. Vincent's, Ratoath, 4/9/2022
 St. Michael's v Oldcastle, Kells, 4/9/2022

Group BRound 1 Drumbaragh 1-14, 5-11 Longwood, Kildalkey, 6/8/2022
 Nobber 2-12, 1-13 Dunderry, Bohermeen, 7/8/2022Round 2 Longwood 0-14, 3-9 Nobber, Bective, 20/8/2022
 Dunderry 1-13, 0-8 Drumbaragh, Carnaross, 21/8/2022Round 3 Dunderry 0-14, 0-8 Longwood, Rathmolyon, 3/9/2022
 Drumbaragh 4-16, 2-9 Nobber, Carlanstown, 3/9/2022

Group CRound 1 St. Patrick's 0-11, 0-8 Blackhall Gaels, Dunsany, 8/7/2022
 Kilmainham 0-7, 1-11 Bective, Páirc Tailteann, 10/7/2022Round 2 Bective 0-8, 3-10 St. Patrick's, Slane, 22/7/2022
 Dunshaughlin 1-17, 1-7 Kilmainham, Walterstown, 23/7/2022Round 3 St. Patrick's 1-9, 2-18 Dunshaughlin, Ashbourne, 5/7/2022
 Blackhall Gaels 2-10, 4-9 Bective, Dunsany, 7/8/2022Round 4 Dunshaughlin 1-16, 0-1 Blackhall Gaels, Moynalvey, 20/8/2022
 Kilmainham 0-16, 3-14 St. Patrick's, Walterstown, 21/8/2022Round 5 Blackhall Gaels 4-10, 1-12 Kilmainham, Walterstown, 3/9/2022
 Bective 1-5, 4-12 Dunshaughlin, Dunsany, 3/9/2022

Group DRound 1 Rathkenny 2-14, 1-7 Ballivor, Dunderry, 7/7/2022
 Clann na nGael 1-10, 2-23 Duleek/Bellewstown, Seneschalstown, 7/7/2022Round 2 Ballivor 3-14, 1-9 Clann na nGael, Boardsmill, 22/7/2022
 Meath Hill 2-4, 1-12 Rathkenny, Páirc Tailteann, 23/7/2022Round 3 Duleek/Bellewstown 3-15, 2-11 Ballivor, Walterstown, 5/8/2022
 Clann na nGael 4-9, 0-15 Meath Hill, Kilmainham, 7/8/2022Round 4 Meath Hill 2-11, 1-11 Duleek/Bellewstown, Páirc Tailteann, 21/8/2022
 Rathkenny 2-17, 2-6 Clann na nGael, Páirc Tailteann, 21/8/2022Round 5 Duleek/Bellewstown 4-9, 2-13 Rathkenny, Slane, 4/9/2022
 Ballivor 1-12, 2-10 Meath Hill''', Páirc Tailteann, 4/9/2022

Knock-Out Stage
The top two teams from each group qualify for the quarter-finals. Quarter Final pairings were drawn with one group winner and one 2nd placed team in each pair with no repeat pairings from group stages. Semi Final pairings were determined by an open draw. The draw for the quarter-finals and Semi-Finals took place on 5th September 2022.

Quarter-finals

Semi-finals

Final

Relegation play-off
Three teams will be relegated from the 2022 IFC. The last placed team in each group will contest the relegation playoffs. Each team was randomly drawn into relegation semi-finals. The winners of the semi-finals will contest the relegation final. The winner of the relegation final will preserve their intermediate status while the losers of the semi-finals and final will be relegated to the 2023 JFC.
The draw for the Relegation Semi-Finals took place on 5th September 2022.

Relegation Semi-Finals

Relegation Final

References

External links

Meath IFC
Meath Intermediate Football Championship
Meath Intermediate Football Championship